The old Swansea Central Library in Swansea in Britain was a public lending and reference library located in Alexandra Road, in the Swansea city centre.  The old library, a Grade II listed building, is now occupied by Swansea Metropolitan University's Welsh School of Architectural Glass.

History
The library was designed by Henry Holtom of Dewsbury in the Italian classical style and opened in 1887 by the former and future Prime Minister William Ewart Gladstone. The circular reference library,  in diameter, has a domed top,  feet high in the centre. The collections provided a repository of source material for research on Swansea in particular and Wales in general. The Dylan Thomas Collection, established in the early 1950s, consisted of over 3,000 books and periodical articles written by, or about, the Swansea-born poet and author.

The library was closed on 6 November 2007.  After its closure, the interior of the library building, including the domed reading room, was used extensively by BBC Wales as a location for the Doctor Who episodes "Silence in the Library" and "Forest of the Dead". The new Swansea Central Library, opened in March 2008, is located in the Civic Centre alongside the West Glamorgan Archives Service.

In 2007, Swansea Metropolitan University announced that they were planning on acquiring the Old Central Library building to become part of the university. With funding assistance from the EU, Swansea Metropolitan University gave the building a £9.69 million renovation, almost £5 million over the budget, turning it into the new Welsh School of Architectural Glass, in 2015. A spokesman for the university stated that additional works were undertaken to meet revised requirements of the ‘listed’ elements of the building, including the round reading room, the reinstatement of the cupola to the central tower (damaged by World War II bombing) and works to the ‘party’ walls.

References

External links
 Swansea Libraries website

Library buildings completed in 1887
Former library buildings in Wales
Grade II listed buildings in Swansea
Swansea Metropolitan University